Dr. Laban Lacy Rice (October 14, 1870 – February 13, 1973) was an educator, author, and president of Cumberland University. He was an international authority on relativity.

Early life
He was born in Dixon, Kentucky, to Laban Marchbanks Rice, a Confederate veteran and  prominent tobacco merchant, and his wife, Martha Lacy. He was an older brother of the poet Cale Young Rice. Lacy Rice grew up with his family in Evansville, Indiana, and Louisville, Kentucky.

He received his BA, MA, and PhD degrees from Cumberland University. While a student at Cumberland, he was one of five men to found the Theta chapter of Kappa Sigma Fraternity on October 7, 1887. Rice married Blanche Alexander Buchanan in Lebanon, Tennessee, and was the father of two daughters, Katherine and Anne. After his retirement, he made his home in Warwick, Virginia.

Career
He served as a professor of English at Cumberland University, as headmaster at Castle Heights Military Academy, and as associate editor of the Cumberland Presbyterian prior to being elected as president of Cumberland University. He also founded a private girls' camp called Camp Nakanawa and was an amateur astronomer. The Rice Observatory on the Cumberland University campus is named after him.  In 1902 he along with Edward E. Weir, PhD (who also taught with him at Cumberland University) were on faculty at the Lebanon College for Young Ladies.

His birthplace in Webster County, Kentucky, is designated by Historic Marker #1508, which reads:

Death
He died in St. Petersburg, Florida, in 1973, at the age of 102, and was buried at the Cedar Grove Cemetery in Lebanon, Tennessee.

References

External links
Rice family page
Rice family home on Dixon, KY site

1870 births
1973 deaths
Heads of universities and colleges in the United States
People from Webster County, Kentucky
Writers from Evansville, Indiana
Writers from Louisville, Kentucky
American centenarians
Men centenarians